Bostir Rani Suriya is a Bangladeshi lady action based film, directed by Montazur Rahman Akbar Original Story and produced by Dipjol. Main role by national award-winning actress Sadika Parvin Popy. Film was declared super hit at box office but banned by the censor board in 2005.

Plot

Cast
 Shakib Khan as Miskatur Rahman
 Sadika Parvin Popy as Suriya
 Misha Sawdagor as Raja
 Dipjol as Iqbal Tarashi
 Afzal Sharif as Tengra
 Siraj Haider
 Rasheda Chowdhury
 Chita
 Gangua
 Mehedi
 Boby
 Shahnaz

Soundtrack

References

External links 

2004 films
2004 romantic drama films
Bengali-language Bangladeshi films
Bangladeshi romantic drama films
2000s Bengali-language films